City Oilers is a basketball club based in Lugogo, Kampala, Uganda. The team competes in the Ugandan National Basketball League (NBL), where it has won eight championships, the most in league history. The Oilers play in the Basketball Africa League (BAL) in the 2023 season.

History
The club was founded by a group of friends who decided to play basketball together. They started playing pick-up games at courts in Kampala, with former national league players joining. Later, Justus Mugisha became head coach and suggested the team joined a basketball league. In 2011, the team was pitched to the director of oil company City Oil and the team was founded as City Oilers. The team started in the NBL Division III in 2011. Later, the team promoted to the NBL Uganda, which it would win eight straight years from 2014. Additionally, the team made several continental appearances, including the 2009 FIBA Africa Clubs Champions Cup.

The team played in the first round of the 2022 BAL Qualifying Tournaments where it finished the group play 2-0 but eventually withdrew before the start of the Elite 16. The following year, City Oilers successfully qualified for the 2023 BAL season after beating Urunani in the third place game of the Road to BAL.

Honours
National Basketball League
Winners (8): 2014, 2015, 2016, 2017, 2018, 2019, 2022

In international competition

In the FIBA Africa Clubs Champions 
FIBA Africa Clubs Champions Cup  (1 appearance)
2009 – Ninth Place

In the Basketball Africa League 
The City Oilers have played in the Road to BAL three times, qualifying in 2023.

Personnel

Current roster 
The following is the City Oilers roster for the 2020 BAL Qualifying Tournaments:

Notable players

 Jimmy Enabu
 Kami Kabange
 Stanley Ocitti
 James Okello
 Stephen Omony
 Robinson Opong
 A'Darius Pegues

References

External links
City Oilers at Afrobasket.com

Basketball teams in Uganda
Sport in Kampala
Basketball teams established in 2011
2011 establishments in Uganda
Road to BAL teams

Basketball Africa League teams